Oleg Aleksandrovich Akulov (born 6 January 1973) is a Russian football coach and a former player.

References

1973 births
Living people
Russian footballers
FC Zhemchuzhina Sochi players
Russian Premier League players
FC Kuban Krasnodar players
FC Akhmat Grozny players
Russian football managers
FC Kristall Smolensk players
Association football forwards
FC Volga Ulyanovsk players